The Great Impersonation is a 1935 American drama film directed by Alan Crosland and starring Edmund Lowe, Valerie Hobson and Wera Engels. It was adapted from the 1920 novel The Great Impersonation by E. Phillips Oppenheim. It was made by Universal Pictures with some aesthetic similarities to the Universal Horror films of the 1930s. Two other film versions of the story were made with the same title in 1921 and 1942 respectively.

Plot
Before the First World War, Sir Everard Dominey, a drunken upper-class Englishman, encounters an old acquaintance the sinister German arms dealer Baron Leopold von Ragostein in Africa. The two men are identical, and von Ragostein plans to kill his doppelganger and take his place in British high society where he will be able to further his arms business and spy on Britain for the German Empire. He arranges the murder with his various associates.

When "Dominey" returns to London shortly afterwards, he encounters the German aristocrat Stephanie Elderstrom who is certain she recognises him as her former lover, von Ragostein. von Ragostein's associates attempt to buy her off but she remains convinced something untoward is going on. When he reaches Donimey Hall, Dominey's wife is equally certain that it is her genuine husband returning from Africa at long-last. Gradually, doubts begin to emerge whether it is the real Dominey who has come home.

Cast
 Edmund Lowe as Sir Everard Dominey/Baron Leopold von Ragostein 
 Valerie Hobson as Eleanor Dominey 
 Wera Engels as Princess Stephanie Elderstrom 
 Murray Kinnell as Seaman 
 Henry Mollison as Eddie Pelham 
 Esther Dale as Mrs. Unthank 
 Brandon Hurst as Middleton 
 Ivan F. Simpson as Doctor Harrison 
 Spring Byington as Duchess Caroline 
 Lumsden Hare as Duke Henry 
 Charles Waldron as Sir Ivan Brunn 
 Leonard Mudie as Mangan 
 Claude King as Sir Gerald Hume 
 Frank Reicher as Doctor Trenk 
 Harry Allen as Perkins
 Lowden Adams as Waiter 
 Frank Benson as English Farmer 
 Robert Bolder as Villager 
 Willy Castello as Duval 
 Edward Cooper as Butler 
 David Dunbar as English Farmer 
 Dwight Frye as Roger Unthank 
 Nan Grey as Middleton's Daughter  
 Virginia Hammond as Lady Hume 
 Henry Kolker as Doctor Schmidt 
 Priscilla Lawson as Maid 
 Adolph Milar as German 
 Thomas R. Mills as Bartender 
 Pat O'Hara as Chauffeur 
 John Powers as Policeman 
 Tom Ricketts as Villager 
 Violet Seaton as Nurse 
 Leonid Snegoff as Wolff 
 Larry Steers as Army Officer  
 Frank Terry as Villager 
 Douglas Wood as Nobleman  
 Harry Worth as Hugo

References

Bibliography
 Weaver, Tom & Brunas, Michael & Brunas, John. Universal Horrors: The Studio's Classic Films, 1931-1946. McFarland & Company, 2007.

External links

1935 films
American historical drama films
Films directed by Alan Crosland
Universal Pictures films
Films set in England
Films set in London
Films set in Africa
Films based on British novels
Films set in the 1910s
Films based on works by E. Phillips Oppenheim
1930s historical drama films
American black-and-white films
Films about identity theft
1935 drama films
1930s English-language films
1930s American films